Marc Anthony Castro (born August 19, 1999) is an American professional boxer. As an amateur, he won gold medals at the 2015 Junior World Championships and 2016 Youth World Championships, both at bantamweight.

Early life
Castro was born and raised in Fresno, California. His mother, Lorena Camacho, was born in Mexicali, Mexico and raised in Fresno, Ca., while his father, Tony Castro, is a Salvadoran refugee from San Miguel. He started training as a boxer under his father at the age of four.

Castro graduated as valedictorian of Sunnyside High School in 2017 and went on to attend Fresno State University.

Amateur career
As an amateur, Castro compiled a record of 177–7. He was a two-time amateur world champion, 16-time national champion, three-time National Silver Gloves champion, and two-time National Junior Olympics Champion.

Professional career
Castro had his eyes set on the 2020 Olympics; however a last-minute illness forced him to pull out of the Team USA qualifiers. He considered participating for his parents' home nations of Mexico or El Salvador before ultimately deciding to sign with Matchroom Boxing and become professional.

Super featherweight
Castro’s professional debut was twice postponed; once due to the COVID-19 pandemic and another after Castro contracted COVID-19. His debut finally came on December 19, 2020 against Luis Javier Valdes. The bout was placed on the main card of Canelo Álvarez vs. Callum Smith at the Alamodome in San Antonio, Texas. Castro won via third-round knockout.

Professional boxing record

References

External links
 

Living people
1999 births
American male boxers
Sportspeople from Fresno, California
Boxers from California
Super-featherweight boxers
American sportspeople of Mexican descent
American sportspeople of Salvadoran descent